Furnes may refer to:

People
Kjell Furnes (born 1936), a Norwegian politician

Places

Belgium
 Furnes, Belgium, the French name for the city of Veurne in West Flanders
 Canal de Furnes, the French part of Nieuwpoort–Dunkirk Canal that connects Dunkirk to Veurne, Belgium

Norway
 Furnes, Norway, a village in Ringsaker municipality in Innlandet county
 Furnes (municipality), a former municipality in the old Hedmark county
 Furnes Church, a church in Ringsaker municipality in Innlandet county

Other
Battle of Furnes, a battle in 1297 between French and Flemish forces
Furnes Fotball, an association football club in Ringsaker, Norway
Furnes SF, a skiing club in Ringsaker, Norway

See also
 Furness (disambiguation)